Maceo Anderson (September 3, 1910 – July 4, 2001 in Los Angeles, California) expressed an interest in dancing at the age of three. As a child, he used to sneak into the Lafayette Theatre to watch performances with his young friends. He and his friends would practice dance routines. As a young man in his teens, he founded a trio of dancers who performed at Harlem's Cotton Club.

Anderson was the founder of the tap dancing group known as "The Four Step Brothers". The group performed successfully for over thirty years. They were credited as being the first black act to perform at Radio City Music Hall.  The Four Step Brothers also made television and motion picture appearances. Their dance routines were a unique blend of soft shoe, tap, acrobatic tricks, and complicated footwork. Anderson performed with the group throughout their existence. They performed abroad and with the Duke Ellington Orchestra. Ellington wrote "Mystery Song" for Anderson and his performing friends, Al Williams and Walker. The three performed together as "The Three Step Brothers" until the 1930s when they added a fourth performer to the group and at that time, they became known again as "The Four Step Brothers".

For a short period of time, the foursome did not perform together. Anderson was drafted into the United States Army in 1941. In 1943, The Four Step Brothers were asked to perform in a variety of short Hollywood films. In 1946, they performed with Frank Sinatra and then embarked on a six-month performance at the Parisian Le Lido followed by tours to Italy and Spain. In 1953, they performed with Bob Hope in Here Come the Girls.

After retiring from dance, Anderson became a church minister and actively worked to help the homeless in the Los Angeles area. The Four Step Brothers were honored in 1988 with a star on the Hollywood Walk of Fame.

Anderson died in Los Angeles, California on July 4, 2001.  His grandson, Robert L. Reed and Reed's children, have followed "in the steps" of Anderson and are tap dancing performers.

Sources
Encyclopædia Britannica online
http://www.guardian.co/uk/print/04224184-103684,00.html

American tap dancers
1910 births
2001 deaths
20th-century American dancers